The Shakespeare Express is a steam-hauled passenger excursion train that has operated since 1999. The outbound journey operates via the North Warwickshire Line with the return using the Stratford to Leamington and Chiltern Main Lines.

It is operated by Vintage Trains, with traction generally supplied by Tyseley Locomotive Works although locomotives from elsewhere may be brought in on an as-required basis. As there are no turning locomotive facilities at Stratford-upon-Avon, the train operates with the locomotive running tender first in one direction.

References

External links
Official website

Named passenger trains of the United Kingdom
Railway services introduced in 1999